Grossopterus is a genus of prehistoric eurypterid classified as part of the family Waeringopteridae. The genus contains two species, G. inexpectans from Gilboa, United States and G. overathi from Overath, Germany.

See also

 List of eurypterids

References

Devonian eurypterids
Diploperculata
Devonian arthropods of Europe
Devonian arthropods of North America
Eurypterids of Europe